Nelder is a giant sequoia located within the Nelder Grove of Sequoia National Forest in California. It is the largest tree in Nelder Grove, the 23rd largest giant sequoia in the world, and could be considered the 22nd largest depending on how badly Ishi Giant atrophied during the Rough Fire in 2015.

Description
The base of the tree, much like the surrounding trees, was charred during the 2017 Railroad Fire.

History
On July 3, 1859, naturalist Galen Clark, Judge John W. Fitzhugh, and journalist L.A. Holmes discovered the tree while on a hunting expedition in the area. In 1875, prospector-turned-hermit John A. Nelder built a cabin near the tree, which he considered to be the largest in the world. Nelder met naturalist John Muir later that same year, but when Muir measured the tree, he determined it to be smaller than the Grizzly Giant tree of Mariposa Grove. Nelder's tree, though narrower, was later found to be taller and more voluminous than the Grizzly Giant, making it the second largest giant sequoia in the region after the Washington tree of Mariposa Grove.

Dimensions

See also
List of largest giant sequoias
List of individual trees

References

Individual giant sequoia trees
Sequoia National Forest